Vinje is a dispersed settlement north of Dolsko in the Municipality of Dol pri Ljubljani in the southeastern part of the Upper Carniola region of Slovenia.

Church

The church in Vinje is dedicated to the Assumption of Mary. It is a chapel of ease and belongs to the parish of Saint Helena in Kamnica. The church is originally a medieval structure mentioned in written records in 1526, and it was reworked in the 18th and 19th centuries. It is surrounded by a walled cemetery. The church has a rectangular nave and chancel with a barrel-vaulted ceiling. The bell tower stands to the west; it has an arched entrance.

References

External links

Vinje on Geopedia

Populated places in the Municipality of Dol pri Ljubljani